Brandon Chang (Pha̍k-fa-sṳ: Chong Tsok-nâm; Hanyu Pinyin: Zhāng Zhúonán; born 28 December 1982) is a Taiwanese musician and actor.

Early life 
Chang was born on 28 December 1982 in Toronto, Ontario, Canada. He began taking piano lessons at age five and guitar at age 10. Though he mainly spoke English with his siblings and friends, he also spoke Mandarin and Cantonese at home with his father, a Taiwanese, and his mother, a Hong Kong Chinese. At the age of 14, he moved to Hong Kong with his family, and by early 20s, he moved back to Taipei, Taiwan.

His career began at the age of 16 when Brandon started modeling in Hong Kong. His first casting landed him a commercial shoot with Nokia in France. This was followed by several other shoots with fashionable brands. Within a year, Chang was cast to star in one of Hong Kong's popular teen dramas, then known as RTHK's Y2K.

Career
By 2001, Chang signed under Media Asia Entertainment Group, one of Asia's largest and most successful Chinese language film studios It was then that Michelle Yeoh took notice of Chang and his talents. Brandon's family soon became very close to Michelle, and with the approval of his parents, Michelle took Chang as her apprentice. Chang started shooting his first film in the same year, The Touch (2002), starring Hollywood's Ben Chaplin and Richard Roxburgh, followed by Silver Hawk (2003).

In 2005. Chang launched his own lifestyle sneaker brand "Greedy Genius" in the United States. Greedy Genius immediately captured a following with many celebrities and rappers around the globe and sold to top stores including well known fashion department store Barneys New York. In the recent years, Greedy Genius has become a household name in the sneaker market covered by leading magazines and websites throughout the world and has expanded its market throughout United States, Europe, Canada, Japan, Korea, Taiwan, Singapore, and Eurasia.

In 2009, Chang was chosen by Bloomberg Businessweek as one of Asia's Best Young Entrepreneurs.

In 2010, Chang partnered with Mandopop singer songwriter JJ Lin to form fashion label Still Moving Under Gunfire (SMG). Retail stores and operations in Taiwan and China.

In 2013, Chang partnered for the apparel brand MSFTSrep. Founded by celebrity Jaden Smith
 
In 2013, Chang signed with Creative Artists Agency (CAA), one of Hollywood's top talent agencies.  In the same year he also joined Invincible Plan company founded by actor Bolin Chen and movie producer Maxx Tsai for management and film productions.

References

External links

1982 births
Living people
Canadian people of Chinese descent
Canadian people of Taiwanese descent
Male actors from Toronto
Musicians from Toronto
Taiwanese male film actors
21st-century Taiwanese male singers